In 1996 and 1997, NASCAR held exhibition races on the East portion of the Suzuka Circuit in Suzuka City, Mie Prefecture, Japan. Several Japanese, Australian and Winston West Series drivers participated among some of the Winston Cup Series regulars. In 1997, rain tires were used in NASCAR competition for the first time, being run in practice and qualifying. The races were broadcast on TBS in the U.S. The following year saw a race at Twin Ring Motegi.

Race winners

References

1996 in Japanese motorsport
1996 in NASCAR
1997 in Japanese motorsport
1997 in NASCAR
Former NASCAR races
NASCAR races at Suzuka Circuit
Sport in Mie Prefecture